In the United States, judicial review is the legal power of a court to determine if a statute, treaty, or administrative regulation contradicts or violates the provisions of existing law, a State Constitution, or ultimately the United States Constitution. While the U.S. Constitution does not explicitly define the power of judicial review, the authority for judicial review in the United States has been inferred from the structure, provisions, and history of the Constitution.

Two landmark decisions by the U.S. Supreme Court served to confirm the inferred constitutional authority for judicial review in the United States. In 1796, Hylton v. United States was the first case decided by the Supreme Court involving a direct challenge to the constitutionality of an act of Congress, the Carriage Act of 1794 which imposed a "carriage tax". The Court performed judicial review of the plaintiff's claim that the carriage tax was unconstitutional. After review, the Supreme Court decided the Carriage Act was constitutional. In 1803, Marbury v. Madison was the first Supreme Court case where the Court asserted its authority to strike down a law as unconstitutional. At the end of his opinion in this decision, Chief Justice John Marshall maintained that the Supreme Court's responsibility to overturn unconstitutional legislation was a necessary consequence of their sworn oath of office to uphold the Constitution as instructed in Article Six of the Constitution. 

, the United States Supreme Court has held 176 Acts of the U.S. Congress unconstitutional. In the period 1960–2019, the Supreme Court has held 483 laws unconstitutional in whole or in part.

Judicial review before the Constitution

Before the Constitutional Convention in 1787, the power of judicial review had been exercised in a number of states. In the years from 1776 to 1787, state courts in at least seven of the thirteen states had engaged in judicial review and had invalidated state statutes because they violated the state constitution or other higher law. The first American decision to recognize the principle of judicial review was Bayard v. Singleton, decided in 1787 by the Supreme Court of North Carolina's predecessor. The North Carolina court and its counterparts in other states treated state constitutions as statements of governing law to be interpreted and applied by judges.

These courts reasoned that because their state constitution was the fundamental law of the state, they must apply the state constitution rather than an act of the legislature that was inconsistent with the state constitution. These state court cases involving judicial review were reported in the press and produced public discussion and comment.  Notable state cases involving judicial review include Commonwealth v. Caton, (Virginia, 1782), Rutgers v. Waddington (New York, 1784), Trevett v. Weeden (Rhode Island, 1786).  Scholar Larry Kramer agreed with Justice Iredell that any judge who enforces an unconstitutional law becomes complicit in the unconstitutionality and that they themselves become lawbreakers.

At least seven of the delegates to the Constitutional Convention, including Alexander Hamilton, John Blair Jr. George Wythe, and Edmund Randolph, had personal experience with judicial review because they had been lawyers or judges in these state court cases involving judicial review. Other delegates referred to some of these state court cases during the debates at the Constitutional Convention. The concept of judicial review therefore was familiar to the framers and to the public before the Constitutional Convention.

Some historians argue that Dr. Bonham's Case was influential in the development of judicial review in the United States.

Provisions of the Constitution

The text of the Constitution does not contain a specific reference to the power of judicial review. Rather, the power to declare laws unconstitutional has been deemed an implied power, derived from Article III and Article VI.

The provisions relating to the federal judicial power in Article III state:

The Supremacy Clause of Article VI states:

The power of judicial review has been implied from these provisions based on the following reasoning. It is the inherent duty of the courts to determine the applicable law in any given case. The Supremacy Clause says "[t]his Constitution" is the "supreme law of the land." The Constitution therefore is the fundamental law of the United States. Federal statutes are the law of the land only when they are "made in pursuance" of the Constitution. State constitutions and statutes are valid only if they are consistent with the Constitution. Any law contrary to the Constitution is void. The federal judicial power extends to all cases "arising under this Constitution." As part of their inherent duty to determine the law, the federal courts have the duty to interpret and apply the Constitution and to decide whether a federal or state statute conflicts with the Constitution. All judges are bound to follow the Constitution. If there is a conflict, the federal courts have a duty to follow the Constitution and to treat the conflicting statute as unenforceable. The Supreme Court has final appellate jurisdiction in all cases arising under the Constitution, so the Supreme Court has the ultimate authority to decide whether statutes are consistent with the Constitution.

Statements by the framers of the Constitution regarding judicial review

Constitutional Convention

During the debates at the Constitutional Convention, the Founding Fathers made a number of references to the concept of judicial review. The greatest number of these references occurred during the discussion of the proposal known as the Virginia Plan. The Virginia Plan included a "council of revision" that would have examined proposed new federal laws and would have accepted or rejected them, similar to today's presidential veto. The "council of revision" would have included the president along with some federal judges. Several delegates objected to the inclusion of federal judges on the council of revision. They argued the federal judiciary, through its power to declare laws unconstitutional, already had the opportunity to protect against legislative encroachment, and the judiciary did not need a second way to negate laws by participating in the council of revision. For example, Elbridge Gerry said federal judges "would have a sufficient check against encroachments on their own department by their exposition of the laws, which involved a power of deciding on their constitutionality. In some states the judges had actually set aside laws, as being against the constitution. This was done too with general approbation." Luther Martin said: "[A]s to the constitutionality of laws, that point will come before the judges in their official character. In this character they have a negative on the laws. Join them with the executive in the revision, and they will have a double negative." These and other similar comments by the delegates indicated that the federal courts would have the power of judicial review.

Other delegates argued that if federal judges were involved in the law-making process through participation on the council of revision, their objectivity as judges in later deciding on the constitutionality of those laws could be impaired. These comments indicated a belief that the federal courts would have the power to declare laws unconstitutional.

At several other points in the debates at the Constitutional Convention, delegates made comments indicating their belief that under the Constitution, federal judges would have the power of judicial review. For example, James Madison said: "A law violating a constitution established by the people themselves, would be considered by the Judges as null & void." George Mason said that federal judges "could declare an unconstitutional law void." However, Mason added that the power of judicial review is not a general power to strike down all laws, but only ones that are unconstitutional:

But with regard to every law however unjust, oppressive or pernicious, which did not come plainly under this description, they would be under the necessity as Judges to give it a free course.

In all, fifteen delegates from nine states made comments regarding the power of the federal courts to review the constitutionality of laws. All but two of them supported the idea that the federal courts would have the power of judicial review. Some delegates to the Constitutional Convention did not speak about judicial review during the Convention, but did speak about it before or after the Convention. Including these additional comments by Convention delegates, scholars have found that twenty-five or twenty-six of the Convention delegates made comments indicating support for judicial review, while three to six delegates opposed judicial review. One review of the debates and voting records of the convention counted as many as forty delegates who supported judicial review, with four or five opposed.

In their comments relating to judicial review, the framers indicated that the power of judges to declare laws unconstitutional was part of the system of separation of powers. The framers stated that the courts' power to declare laws unconstitutional would provide a check on the legislature, protecting against excessive exercise of legislative power.

State ratification debates

Judicial review was discussed in at least seven of the thirteen state ratifying conventions, and was mentioned by almost two dozen delegates. In each of these conventions, delegates asserted that the proposed Constitution would allow the courts to exercise judicial review. There is no record of any delegate to a state ratifying convention who indicated that the federal courts would not have the power of judicial review.

For example, James Wilson asserted in the Pennsylvania ratifying convention that federal judges would exercise judicial review: "If a law should be made inconsistent with those powers vested by this instrument in Congress, the judges, as a consequence of their independence, and the particular powers of government being defined, will declare such law to be null and void. For the power of the Constitution predominates. Anything, therefore, that shall be enacted by Congress contrary thereto will not have the force of law."

In the Connecticut ratifying convention, Oliver Ellsworth likewise described judicial review as a feature of the Constitution: "This Constitution defines the extent of the powers of the general government. If the general legislature should at any time overleap their limits, the judicial department is a constitutional check. If the United States go beyond their powers, if they make a law which the Constitution does not authorize, it is void; and the judicial power, the national judges, who, to secure their impartiality, are to be made independent, will declare it to be void."

During the ratification process, supporters and opponents of ratification published pamphlets, essays, and speeches debating various aspects of the Constitution. Publications by over a dozen authors in at least twelve of the thirteen states asserted that under the Constitution, the federal courts would have the power of judicial review. There is no record of any opponent to the Constitution who claimed that the Constitution did not involve a power of judicial review.

After reviewing the statements made by the founders, one scholar concluded: "The evidence from the Constitutional Convention and from the state ratification conventions is overwhelming that the original public meaning of the term 'judicial power' [in Article III] included the power to nullify unconstitutional laws."

The Federalist Papers

The Federalist Papers, which were published in 1787–1788 to promote ratification of the Constitution, made several references to the power of judicial review. The most extensive discussion of judicial review was in Federalist No. 78, written by Alexander Hamilton, which clearly explained that the federal courts would have the power of judicial review. Hamilton stated that under the Constitution, the federal judiciary would have the power to declare laws unconstitutional. Hamilton asserted that this was appropriate because it would protect the people against abuse of power by Congress:

In Federalist No. 80, Hamilton rejected the idea that the power to decide the constitutionality of an act of Congress should lie with each of the states: "The mere necessity of uniformity in the interpretation of the national laws, decides the question. Thirteen independent courts of final jurisdiction over the same causes, arising upon the same laws, is a hydra in government, from which nothing but contradiction and confusion can proceed." Consistent with the need for uniformity in interpretation of the Constitution, Hamilton explained in Federalist No. 82 that the Supreme Court has authority to hear appeals from the state courts in cases relating to the Constitution.

The arguments against ratification by the Anti-Federalists agreed that the federal courts would have the power of judicial review, though the Anti-Federalists viewed this negatively. Robert Yates, writing under the pseudonym "Brutus", stated:

Judicial review between the adoption of the Constitution and Marbury

Judiciary Act of 1789
The first Congress passed the Judiciary Act of 1789, establishing the lower federal courts and specifying the details of federal court jurisdiction. Section 25 of the Judiciary Act provided for the Supreme Court to hear appeals from state courts when the state court decided that a federal statute was invalid, or when the state court upheld a state statute against a claim that the state statute was repugnant to the Constitution. This provision gave the Supreme Court the power to review state court decisions involving the constitutionality of both federal statutes and state statutes. The Judiciary Act thereby incorporated the concept of judicial review.

Court decisions from 1788 to 1803
Between the ratification of the Constitution in 1788 and the decision in Marbury v. Madison in 1803, judicial review was employed in both the federal and state courts. A detailed analysis has identified thirty-one state or federal cases during this time in which statutes were struck down as unconstitutional, and seven additional cases in which statutes were upheld but at least one judge concluded the statute was unconstitutional. The author of this analysis, Professor William Treanor, concluded: "The sheer number of these decisions not only belies the notion that the institution of judicial review was created by Chief Justice Marshall in Marbury, it also reflects widespread acceptance and application of the doctrine."

Several other cases involving judicial review issues reached the Supreme Court before the issue was definitively decided in Marbury in 1803.

In Hayburn's Case, 2 U.S. (2 Dall.) 408 (1792), federal circuit courts held an act of Congress unconstitutional for the first time. Three federal circuit courts found that Congress had violated the Constitution by passing an act requiring circuit court judges to decide pension applications, subject to the review of the Secretary of War. These circuit courts found that this was not a proper judicial function under Article III. These three decisions were appealed to the Supreme Court, but the appeals became moot when Congress repealed the statute while the appeals were pending.

In an unreported Supreme Court decision in 1794, United States v. Yale Todd, the Supreme Court reversed a pension that was awarded under the same pension act that had been at issue in Hayburn's Case. The Court apparently decided that the act designating judges to decide pensions was not constitutional because this was not a proper judicial function. This apparently was the first Supreme Court case to find an act of Congress unconstitutional. However, there was not an official report of the case and it was not used as a precedent.

Hylton v. United States, 3 U.S. (3 Dall.) 171 (1796), was the first case decided by the Supreme Court that involved a challenge to the constitutionality of an act of Congress. It was argued that a federal tax on carriages violated the constitutional provision regarding "direct" taxes. The Supreme Court upheld the tax, finding it was constitutional. Although the Supreme Court did not strike down the act in question, the Court engaged in the process of judicial review by considering the constitutionality of the tax. The case was widely publicized at the time, and observers understood that the Court was testing the constitutionality of an act of Congress. Because it found the statute valid, the Court did not have to assert that it had the power to declare a statute unconstitutional.

In Ware v. Hylton, 3 U.S. (3 Dall.) 199 (1796), the Supreme Court for the first time struck down a state statute. The Court reviewed a Virginia statute regarding pre-Revolutionary war debts and found that it was inconsistent with the peace treaty between the United States and Great Britain. Relying on the Supremacy Clause, the Court found the Virginia statute invalid.

In Hollingsworth v. Virginia, 3 U.S. (3 Dall.) 378 (1798), the Supreme Court found that it did not have jurisdiction to hear the case because of the jurisdiction limitations of the Eleventh Amendment. This holding could be viewed as an implicit finding that the Judiciary Act of 1789, which would have allowed the Court jurisdiction, was unconstitutional in part. However, the Court did not provide any reasoning for its conclusion and did not say that it was finding the statute unconstitutional.

In Cooper v. Telfair, 4 U.S. (4 Dall.) 14 (1800), Justice Chase stated: "It is indeed a general opinion—it is expressly admitted by all this bar and some of the judges have, individually in the circuits decided, that the Supreme Court can declare an act of Congress to be unconstitutional, and therefore invalid, but there is no adjudication of the Supreme Court itself upon the point."

Responses to the Kentucky and Virginia Resolutions

In 1798, the Kentucky and Virginia legislatures passed a series of resolutions asserting that the states have the power to determine whether acts of Congress are constitutional. In response, ten states passed their own resolutions disapproving the Kentucky and Virginia Resolutions. Six of these states took the position that the power to declare acts of Congress unconstitutional lies in the federal courts, not in the state legislatures. For example, Vermont's resolution stated: "It belongs not to state legislatures to decide on the constitutionality of laws made by the general government; this power being exclusively vested in the judiciary courts of the Union."

Thus, five years before Marbury v. Madison, a number of state legislatures stated their understanding that under the Constitution, the federal courts possess the power of judicial review.

Marbury v. Madison

Marbury was the first Supreme Court decision to strike down an act of Congress as unconstitutional. Chief Justice John Marshall wrote the opinion for a unanimous Court.

The case arose when William Marbury filed a lawsuit seeking an order (a "writ of mandamus") requiring the Secretary of State, James Madison, to deliver to Marbury a commission appointing him as a justice of the peace. Marbury filed his case directly in the Supreme Court, invoking the Court's original jurisdiction, rather than filing in a lower court.

The constitutional issue involved the question of whether the Supreme Court had jurisdiction to hear the case. The Judiciary Act of 1789 gave the Supreme Court original jurisdiction in cases involving writs of mandamus. So, under the Judiciary Act, the Supreme Court would have had jurisdiction to hear Marbury's case. However, the Constitution describes the cases in which the Supreme Court has original jurisdiction, and does not include mandamus cases. The Judiciary Act therefore attempted to give the Supreme Court jurisdiction that was not "warranted by the Constitution."

Marshall's opinion stated that in the Constitution, the people established a government of limited powers: "The powers of the Legislature are defined and limited; and that those limits may not be mistaken or forgotten, the Constitution is written." The limits established in the Constitution would be meaningless "if these limits may at any time be passed by those intended to be restrained." Marshall observed that the Constitution is "the fundamental and paramount law of the nation", and that it cannot be altered by an ordinary act of the legislature. Therefore, "an act of the Legislature repugnant to the Constitution is void."

Marshall then discussed the role of the courts, which is at the heart of the doctrine of judicial review. It would be an "absurdity", said Marshall, to require the courts to apply a law that is void. Rather, it is the inherent duty of the courts to interpret and apply the Constitution, and to determine whether there is a conflict between a statute and the Constitution:

Marshall stated that the courts are authorized by the provisions of the Constitution itself to "look into" the Constitution, that is, to interpret and apply it, and that they have the duty to refuse to enforce any laws that are contrary to the Constitution. Specifically, Article III provides that the federal judicial power "is extended to all cases arising under the Constitution." Article VI requires judges to take an oath "to support this Constitution." Article VI also states that only laws "made in pursuance of the Constitution" are the law of the land. Marshall concluded: "Thus, the particular phraseology of the Constitution of the United States confirms and strengthens the principle, supposed to be essential to all written Constitutions, that a law repugnant to the Constitution is void, and that courts, as well as other departments, are bound by that instrument."

Marbury long has been regarded as the seminal case with respect to the doctrine of judicial review. Some scholars have suggested that Marshall's opinion in Marbury essentially created judicial review. In his book The Least Dangerous Branch, Professor Alexander Bickel wrote:

Other scholars view this as an overstatement, and argue that Marbury was decided in a context in which judicial review already was a familiar concept. These scholars point to the facts showing that judicial review was acknowledged by the Constitution's framers, was explained in the Federalist Papers and in the ratification debates, and was used by both state and federal courts for more than twenty years before Marbury, including the Supreme Court in Hylton v. United States. One scholar concluded: "[B]efore Marbury, judicial review had gained wide support."

Judicial review after Marbury

Marbury was the point at which the Supreme Court adopted a monitoring role over government actions. After the Court exercised its power of judicial review in Marbury, it avoided striking down a federal statute during the next fifty years. The court would not do so again until Dred Scott v. Sandford, 60 U.S. (19 How.) 393 (1857).

However, the Supreme Court did exercise judicial review in other contexts. In particular, the Court struck down a number of state statutes that were contrary to the Constitution. The first case in which the Supreme Court struck down a state statute as unconstitutional was Fletcher v. Peck, 10 U.S. (6 Cranch) 87 (1810).

In a few cases, state courts took the position that their judgments were final and were not subject to review by the Supreme Court. They argued that the Constitution did not give the Supreme Court the authority to review state court decisions. They asserted that the Judiciary Act of 1789, which provided that the Supreme Court could hear certain appeals from state courts, was unconstitutional. In effect, these state courts were asserting that the principle of judicial review did not extend to allow federal review of state court decisions. This would have left the states free to adopt their own interpretations of the Constitution.

The Supreme Court rejected this argument. In Martin v. Hunter's Lessee, 14 U.S. (1 Wheat.) 304 (1816), the Court held that under Article III, the federal courts have jurisdiction to hear all cases arising under the Constitution and laws of the United States, and that the Supreme Court has appellate jurisdiction in all such cases, whether those cases are filed in state or federal courts. The Court issued another decision to the same effect in the context of a criminal case, Cohens v. Virginia, 19 U.S. (6 Wheat.) 264 (1821). It is now well established that the Supreme Court may review decisions of state courts that involve federal law.

The Supreme Court also has reviewed actions of the federal executive branch to determine whether those actions were authorized by acts of Congress or were beyond the authority granted by Congress.

Judicial review is now well established as a cornerstone of constitutional law. As of September 2017, the United States Supreme Court had held unconstitutional portions or the entirety of some 182 Acts of the U.S. Congress, the most recently in the Supreme Court's June 2017 Matal v. Tam and 2019 Iancu v. Brunetti decisions striking down a portion of July 1946's Lanham Act as they infringe on Freedom of Speech.

Criticism of judicial review

Although judicial review has now become an established part of constitutional law in the United States, there are some who disagree with the doctrine.

One of the first critics of judicial review was Richard Dobbs Spaight, a signer of the Constitution.  In a correspondence with Supreme Court Justice James Iredell, Spaight wrote of his disapproval of the doctrine:

At the Constitutional Convention, neither proponents nor opponents of judicial review disputed that any government based on a written constitution requires some mechanism to prevent laws that violate that constitution from being made and enforced. Otherwise, the document would be meaningless, and the legislature, with the power to enact any laws whatsoever, would be the supreme arm of government (the British doctrine of parliamentary sovereignty). The delegates at the Convention differed with respect to the question of whether Congress or the judiciary should make determinations regarding constitutionality of statutes. Hamilton addressed this in Federalist No. 78, in which he explained the reasons that the federal judiciary has the role of reviewing the constitutionality of statutes:

Since the adoption of the Constitution, some have argued that the power of judicial review gives the courts the ability to impose their own views of the law, without an adequate check from any other branch of government. Robert Yates, a delegate to the Constitutional Convention from New York, argued during the ratification process in the Anti-Federalist Papers that the courts would use the power of judicial review loosely to impose their views about the "spirit" of the Constitution:

In 1820, Thomas Jefferson expressed his opposition to the doctrine of judicial review:

In 1861, Abraham Lincoln touched upon the same subject, during his first inaugural address:

Lincoln was alluding here to the case of Dred Scott v. Sandford, in which the Court had struck down a federal statute for the first time since Marbury v. Madison.

It has been argued that the judiciary is not the only branch of government that may interpret the meaning of the Constitution. Article VI requires federal and state officeholders to be bound "by Oath or Affirmation, to support this Constitution." It has been argued that such officials may follow their own interpretations of the Constitution, at least until those interpretations have been tested in court.

Some have argued that judicial review exclusively by the federal courts is unconstitutional<ref name="Crosskey">See W.W. Crosskey, Politics and the Constitution in the History of the United States (Chicago: 1953), chs. 27–29, with which compare Hart, Book Review, 67 Harv. L. Rev. 1456 (1954). A brief review of the debate on the subject is Westin, "Introduction: Charles Beard and American Debate over Judicial Review, 1790–1961", in: C. Beard, The Supreme Court and the Constitution (Englewood Cliffs: 1962 reissue of 1938 ed.), 1–34, and bibliography at 133–149. See more at: http://constitution.findlaw.com/article3/annotation13.html#f576</ref> based on two arguments. First, the power of judicial review is not expressly delegated to the federal courts in the Constitution. The Tenth Amendment reserves to the states (or to the people) those powers not expressly delegated to the federal government. The second argument is that the states alone have the power to ratify changes to the "supreme law" (the U.S. Constitution), and each state's understanding of the language of the amendment therefore becomes germane to its implementation and effect, making it necessary that the states play some role in interpreting its meaning. Under this theory, allowing only federal courts to definitively conduct judicial review of federal law allows the national government to interpret its own restrictions as it sees fit, with no meaningful input from the ratifying, that is, validating power.

Standard of review

In the United States, unconstitutionality is the only ground for a federal court to strike down a federal statute. Justice Washington, speaking for the Marshall Court, put it this way in an 1829 case:

If a state statute conflicts with a valid federal statute, then courts may strike down the state statute as an unstatutable violation of the Supremacy Clause. But a federal court may not strike down a statute absent a violation of federal law or of the federal Constitution.

Moreover, a suspicion or possibility of unconstitutionality is not enough for American courts to strike down a statute. Alexander Hamilton explained in Federalist 78 that the standard of review should be "irreconcilable variance" with the Constitution. Anti-federalists agreed that courts would be unable to strike down federal statutes absent a conflict with the Constitution. For example, Robert Yates, writing under the pseudonym "Brutus", asserted that "the courts of the general government [will] be under obligation to observe the laws made by the general legislature not repugnant to the constitution."

These principles—that federal statutes can only be struck down for unconstitutionality and that the unconstitutionality must be clear—were very common views at the time of the framing of the Constitution. For example, George Mason explained during the constitutional convention that judges "could declare an unconstitutional law void. But with regard to every law, however unjust, oppressive or pernicious, which did not come plainly under this description, they would be under the necessity as Judges to give it a free course."

For a number of years, the courts were relatively deferential to Congress. Justice Washington put it this way, in an 1827 case: "It is but a decent respect to the wisdom, integrity, and patriotism of the legislative body, by which any law is passed, to presume in favor of its validity, until its violation of the Constitution is proved beyond a reasonable doubt."

Although judges usually adhered to this principle that a statute could only be deemed unconstitutional in case of a clear contradiction until the twentieth century, this presumption of constitutionality weakened somewhat during the twentieth century, as exemplified by the Supreme Court's famous footnote four in United States v. Carolene Products Co., 304 U.S. 144 (1938), which suggested that statutes may be subjected to closer scrutiny in certain types of cases. Nevertheless, the federal courts have not departed from the principle that courts may only strike down statutes for unconstitutionality.

Of course, the practical implication of this principle is that a court cannot strike down a statute, even if it recognizes that the statute is obviously poorly drafted, irrational, or arises from legislators' corrupt motives, unless the flaw in the statute rises to the level of a clear constitutional violation. In 2008, Justice John Paul Stevens reaffirmed this point in a concurring opinion: "[A]s I recall my esteemed former colleague, Thurgood Marshall, remarking on numerous occasions: 'The Constitution does not prohibit legislatures from enacting stupid laws.'"

In the federal system, courts may only decide actual cases or controversies; it is not possible to request the federal courts to review a law without at least one party having legal standing to engage in a lawsuit. This principle means that courts sometimes do not exercise their power of review, even when a law is seemingly unconstitutional, for want of jurisdiction. In some state courts, such as the Massachusetts Supreme Judicial Court, legislation may be referred in certain circumstances by the legislature or by the executive for an advisory ruling on its constitutionality prior to its enactment (or enforcement).

The U.S. Supreme Court seeks to avoid reviewing the Constitutionality of an act where the case before it could be decided on other grounds, an attitude and practice exemplifying judicial restraint. Justice Brandeis framed it thus (citations omitted):

Laws limiting judicial review

Although the Supreme Court continues to review the constitutionality of statutes, Congress and the states retain some power to influence what cases come before the Court. For example, the Constitution at Article III, Section 2, gives Congress power to make exceptions to the Supreme Court's appellate jurisdiction. The Supreme Court has historically acknowledged that its appellate jurisdiction is defined by Congress, and thus Congress may have power to make some legislative or executive actions unreviewable. This is known as jurisdiction stripping.

Another way for Congress to limit judicial review was tried in January 1868, when a bill was proposed requiring a two-thirds majority of the Court in order to deem any Act of Congress unconstitutional. The bill was approved by the House, 116 to 39. That measure died in the Senate, partly because the bill was unclear about how the bill's own constitutionality would be decided.

Many other bills have been proposed in Congress that would require a supermajority in order for the justices to exercise judicial review. During the early years of the United States, a two-thirds majority was necessary for the Supreme Court to exercise judicial review; because the Court then consisted of six members, a simple majority and a two-thirds majority both required four votes. Currently, the constitutions of two states require a supermajority of supreme court justices in order to exercise judicial review: Nebraska (five out of seven justices) and North Dakota (four out of five justices).

Administrative review
The procedure for judicial review of federal administrative regulation in the United States is set forth by the Administrative Procedure Act although the courts have ruled such as in Bivens v. Six Unknown Named Agents'' that a person may bring a case on the grounds of an implied cause of action when no statutory procedure exists.

Notes

Further reading

 

Legal history of the United States
Federal judiciary of the United States
United States
Article Three of the United States Constitution
Article Six of the United States Constitution